Z-Squad (The Fairies of Crystals Z-Squad) is a computer-animated television series created by Enemes and Nelvana.

Plot
Z-Squad chronicles the adventures of three ordinary school girls turned super heroines and their newfound, cuddly alien counterparts, the Zoots, as they search for enchanted crystals to save the Earth and Z-Nation from a cast of bumbling baddies. It is aimed at kids aged 6 to 9 and there are 26 x 24-minute episodes available. Girls will cheer the competitive-spirited heroines; boys will back the sarcastic schoolboys called the Drop Dead Gorgeous Three (the DDG3), as well as the powerful Prince Aramis and the wise King Woolaf.

Characters

Main Characters
 Chaney (voiced by Chung Misook in the Korean version, and Alyson Court in the English version) is the first member of the Z-Squad with red hair with yellow, pink, and orange streaks that is tied up with two pigtails, white sun visor hat with a yellow trim and a pink star, and red eyes (yellow in the pilot).

Her theme colors are red and yellow. She is represented by stars with her alien counterpart, Zora, the red Zoot of Courage.

 Haemi (voiced by Eun Yeong Seon in the Korean version, and Sunday Muse in the English version) is the second member of the Z-Squad with short rose hair that is tied up in a blue headband with a ribbon, and rose eyes.

Her theme colors are pink and blue. She is represented by hearts with her alien counterpart, Zef, the pink Zoot of Love.

 Jeanie (voiced by Park Youngnam in the Korean version, and Ashley Botting in the English version) is the third and final member of the Z-Squad with green hair that is clipped up in a yellow hair clip, and turquoise blue eyes (formerly green in the pilot) with rose round glasses (red in the pilot).

Her theme colors are green and yellow. She is represented by four-leaf clovers with her alien counterpart, Zuma, the green Zoot of Hope.

Minor characters
 Jinu (voiced by Kang Soo-jin in the Korean version, and Zachary Bennett in the English version)
 Cal (voiced by Kim Youngsun in the Korean version, and Tyrone Savage in the English version)
 Tae-o (voiced by Son Jeong Ah in the Korean version, and Lyon Smith in the English version)
 Bernice (voiced by Choi Moon-ja in the Korean version, and Emilie-Claire Barlow in the English version)
 Aramis (voiced by Son Jeong-ah in the Korean version, and Noah Cappe in the English version)
 Woolaf (voiced by Yoo Dong-kyun in the Korean version, and Dwayne Hill in the English version)
 Bakoo (voiced by Noh Min in the Korean version, and Martin Roach in the English version)
 Grindel (voiced by Choi Moon-ja in the Korean version, and Melissa Altro in the English version)

Production
The series' unique blend of traditional 2D anime design with 3D cel shading has earned many awards, including the prestigious Grand Prix Award at KOCCA's Star Project Competition in South Korea.

Episodes

Broadcast
Z-Squad first aired in South Korea on SBS between December 2006 and June 2007. The series was later broadcast on Champ, Cartoon Network, Anione, Nickelodeon, and KT IPTV.

The show had its English-language debut on Pop Girl in the United Kingdom and then on Cartoon Network, Boomerang, and Nickelodeon in Australia in late 2008. It also had its French-language debut on Télétoon in France in early 2009. Along with Di-Gata Defenders, Z-Squad was introduced as part of the Syfy Kids block on the multi-national KidsCo network in June 2013. It was also one of the shows included when NBC ported Syfy Kids to Asia the following month. It was aimed at ages 6–10.

Initial plans for a North American broadcast reportedly included YTV and Teletoon in Canada, with Disney Channel on board in the United States. However, the show would never air on linear television in either market, instead being limited to video-on-demand platforms. In Canada, the series was included as part of the Kids Suite service for Rogers Cable customers in 2014. In the United States, Z-Squad is available to purchase on Amazon Video and is available to stream on Tubi TV.

References

External links
 Official Korean website at the Wayback Machine (archived February 12, 2007)
 Z-Squad at Nelvana.com
 

2000s South Korean animated television series
2006 South Korean television series debuts
2007 South Korean television series endings
2000s Canadian animated television series
2008 Canadian television series debuts
2008 Canadian television series endings
Seoul Broadcasting System original programming
Canadian computer-animated television series
Canadian children's animated action television series
Canadian children's animated adventure television series
South Korean children's animated action television series
South Korean children's animated adventure television series
Korean-language television shows
English-language television shows
Magical girl television series
Television series by Nelvana
Anime-influenced Western animated television series
Teen animated television series